HMS Taurus was an  destroyer which served with the Royal Navy during World War I. Ordered from Thornycroft in 1915 and launched in 1917, the vessel operated as part of the Harwich Force until the end of hostilities. Shortly after entering service, Taurus formed part of the destroyer shield for the Royal Navy's bombardment of Ostend that successfully sank the German destroyer S20. After the War, the destroyer was reduced to the Reserve Fleet and sold to be broken up in 1930.

Design and development

Taurus was one of two  destroyers ordered by the British Admiralty from Thornycroft in December 1915 as part of the Seventh War Construction Programme alongside . The ships differed from the six preceding  built by the yard in having all geared turbines and the aft gun being raised on a bandstand.

Displacement was  normal and  full load. Three funnels were fitted, the centre one larger in diameter than the others.

Armament consisted of three QF 4in Mk IV guns on the ship's centreline. One was mounted on the forecastle, one aft and one between the second and third funnels. The ship also mounted a single 2-pounder (40 mm) pom-pom anti-aircraft gun for air defence and four  torpedoes in two twin rotating mounts. The vessel had a complement of 82 officers and ratings.

Construction and career
Laid down in March 1916, Taurus was launched on 10 March 1917. The vessel was named after the Taurus astrological sign and constellation. Taurus was commissioned in May 1917 and served in the Tenth Destroyer Flotilla as part of the Harwich Force.

On 16 October, the ship sailed as part of a force of thirty cruisers and fifty-four destroyers searching for a German fleet that had been misidentified as being of a substantial size, despite being in reality no more than no more than ten vessels. The search did not lead to any contact.

After the war, the destroyer remained with the Tenth Destroyer Flotilla. Taurus was reduced to the Reserve Fleet at Devonport on 16 October 1919 as a tender to the depot ship Woolwich and sold to Metal Industries of Charleston to be broken up on 18 February 1930.

Pennant numbers

References

Citations

Bibliography

 
 
 
 
 
 
 
 
 

1917 ships
R-class destroyers (1916)
Ships built by John I. Thornycroft & Company